Niels Erik Nielsen (1 May 1893 – 4 March 1974) was a Danish gymnast who competed in the 1920 Summer Olympics. He was part of the Danish team, which won the silver medal in the men's gymnastics, Swedish system event in 1920.

References

1893 births
1974 deaths
Danish male artistic gymnasts
Gymnasts at the 1920 Summer Olympics
Olympic gymnasts of Denmark
Olympic silver medalists for Denmark
Olympic medalists in gymnastics
Medalists at the 1920 Summer Olympics